Dowruhan or Duruhan may refer to:
 Dowruhan, Khuzestan
 Duruhan, Kohgiluyeh and Boyer-Ahmad